Dispar compacta, the dispar skipper or barred skipper, is a butterfly of the family Hesperiidae. It is found in the Australian Capital Territory, New South Wales, Queensland, South Australia and Victoria.

The wingspan is about 30 mm. Adults are on wing from January to April.

The larvae feed on Gahnia, Lomandra and Poa species, including Poa tenera. They construct a shelter made from leaves and silk at the base of their host plant in which they rest during the day.

External links
Australian Insects
Australian Faunal Directory

Trapezitinae
Butterflies described in 1882
Butterflies of Australia
Taxa named by Arthur Gardiner Butler